Blyth Lifeboat Station is operated by the Royal National Lifeboat Institution and currently operates a D Class (IB1) "Jennie B".

In 2007 the inshore lifeboat was launched on service 22 times, 11 people were rescued and £31,800 worth of craft were recovered.

History

A lifeboat had first been based at Blyth in 1808, privately sponsored by Sir Matthew Ridley. This boat was wrecked on service in 1810 and was not replaced. In 1826 the Port of Newcastle Shipwreck Association funded a new Blyth lifeboat and in 1866 the RNLI took over the running of the station. In 1920, for the station's first motor lifeboat, the RNLI built a new boathouse and slipway which, with modifications over the years, is still in use for the "D" class inflatable today. The various motor lifeboats over the years were slipway launched until October 1982 when a  fast afloat boat was allocated to the station. The Waveney served until replaced by a new 25-knot  boat in December 1995 (in fact, unusually, all of Blyth's motor lifeboats had been built new for the station). However, a review of lifeboat provision in the North East led to the decision to withdraw the all-weather lifeboat from Blyth, and the station became inshore only on 16 July 2004. Inevitably, decisions to close or downgrade stations often lead to local concerns and following the RNLI's decision the Blyth Volunteer Lifeboat Service was set up and purchased  a 38-foot-6-inch Lochin lifeboat which had been built in 1990 for the Caister Volunteer Rescue Service (a body similarly set up after withdrawal of an RNLI all-weather boat). The boat, named Spirit of Blyth and Wansbeck, went into service in 2005

Fleet

All-weather boats

Inshore lifeboat

See also
 Blyth, Northumberland

References

External links 
 Blyth Lifeboat Station
 RNLI Official Site
 Maritime Coastguard Agency

Lifeboat stations in Northumberland
Buildings and structures in Northumberland